Tanerliq (pronounced tun-ul-lik) is a ship escort, rescue and oil response oceangoing tugboat operated by Crowley Maritime and stationed in Prince William Sound, Alaska. In addition to Tanerliq, her sister ship Nanuq is also stationed in Valdez, Alaska.

These two vessels, in addition to a dozen other units, escort and protect the waters of Prince William Sound, site of the Exxon Valdez-oil spill in 1989.

References

Tugboats of the United States
Ships of the United States
1999 ships